The 2012 Tajik Cup was the 2012 edition of the Tajik Cup. The cup winner qualified for the 2013 AFC Cup.

Preliminary round
Draw made on 6 June.

Matches played on 15 and 19 June.

|}

Round of 16
Draw made on 25 June.

First legs played on 7 and 8 July.

Second legs played on 14 and 15 July.

|}

Quarter-finals
First legs played on 22 and 23 August.

Second legs played on 26 and 27 August.

|}

Semi-finals
First legs played on 12 September.

Second legs played on 15 and 17 September.

Semi-finals

Final
Played on 5 October.

References

External links
Tajikistan Football Federation

Tajikistan Cup
2012 domestic association football cups
2012 in Tajikistani football